Choe Jon-wi ( or  ; born June 29 1993) is a North Korean Olympic weightlifter. He represented his country at the 2016 Summer Olympics. He finished in 8th place in the men's 77kg competition. He was the flagbearer for North Korea during the Parade of Nations.

References 

1993 births
Living people
North Korean male weightlifters
Weightlifters at the 2016 Summer Olympics
Olympic weightlifters of North Korea
Asian Games medalists in weightlifting
Asian Games gold medalists for North Korea
Weightlifters at the 2018 Asian Games
Medalists at the 2018 Asian Games
21st-century North Korean people